Pyongyang is the capital of North Korea.

Pyongyang may also refer to:
Pyongyang (comic), a graphic novel by Guy Delisle
Pyongyang (restaurant chain)
"Pyongyang", a song on the Blur album The Magic Whip

Pyongyang should not be confused with:
Pyeongchang County, a county in Gangwon province, South Korea
Pyonggang, a county in Kangwon province, North Korea